This is a list of notable Azerbaijani architects:

A–M

 Zivar bey Ahmadbeyov
 Sadig Dadashov
 Anvar Gasimzade
 Gasim bey Hajibababeyov
 Mammad Hasan Hajinski
 Mikayil Huseynov
 Karbalayi Safikhan Karabakhi
 Kamal Mammadbeyov
 Gulnara Mehmandarova

N–Z

 Irada Rovshan
 Fuad Seyidzadeh

Gallery

See also

 List of architects
 List of Azerbaijanis

Azerbaijani
Architects